Joseph Martin may refer to:

Military
Joseph Martin (general) (1740–1808), American Revolutionary War general from Virginia
Joseph Plumb Martin (1760–1850), American soldier and memoir writer
Joseph M. Martin (born 1962), U.S. Army officer

Politicians
Joseph Martin (MP for Ipswich) (1649–1729), English MP for Ipswich in 1701
Joseph Martin (1726–1776), British banker and politician
Joseph John Martin (1833–1900), U.S. Congressman from North Carolina
Joseph Martin (Australian politician) (1898–1940), member of the New South Wales Legislative Council
Joseph Martin (Canadian politician) (1852–1923), lawyer and politician known as "Fighting Joe"
Joseph R. Martin (1926–2008), Canadian politician in the Legislative Assembly of New Brunswick
Joseph W. Martin Jr. (1884–1968), Speaker of the U.S. House
Joseph Martin (Wisconsin politician) (1878–1946), Wisconsin State Assemblyman
Joseph A. Martin (1888–1928), mayor of Detroit, Michigan in 1924
J. C. Martin (Texas politician) (Joseph Claude Martin, Jr., 1913–1998),  mayor of Laredo, Texas
Joseph C. Martin, mayor of Erie, Pennsylvania

Religion
Joseph-Marie Martin (1891–1976), French prelate of the Roman Catholic Church
Joseph Martin (bishop) (1903–1982), Bishop of Ngozi and Bururi in Burundi
Joseph Martin (speaker) (1924–2009), Roman Catholic priest, speaker on the issues of alcoholism and drug addiction

Others
Joseph Martin (gardener) (fl. 1788–1826), Enlightenment gardener-botanist and plant collector
Joseph Martin (reporter) (1915–1981), journalist and Pulitzer Prize-winner
Lock Martin (1916–1959), 7-foot-plus US actor
Joseph B. Martin (born 1938), professor of neurobiology
Joseph Martin (arts administrator), National Gallery of Canada director
J. C. Martin (baseball) (Joseph Clifton Martin, born 1936), Major League Baseball player

See also
Joe Martin (disambiguation)
Joey Martin (disambiguation)

Martyn Joseph (born 1960), Welsh singer-songwriter